Narberth station is a SEPTA Regional Rail station in Narberth, Pennsylvania. Located at Haverford and Narberth Avenues in Narberth, Pennsylvania, it serves most Paoli/Thorndale Line trains with the exception of several express runs.

The station was rebuilt around 1980 in a minimalist style common to that era, replacing a dilapidated wooden structure, under an agreement between SEPTA and the Narberth Borough Council, championed by Narberth Councilman Bharat Bhargava. The Ivy Ridge station was also built in the same style. A train crash occurred on the curve here on November 21, 1984 injuring 150 people.

The ticket office at this station is open weekdays 6:15 a.m. to 1:35 p.m. excluding holidays. There are 111 parking spaces at the station, with 3 bicycle racks accommodating up to 15 bicycles.

This station is in fare zone 2 and is 6.8 track miles from Suburban Station. In 2017, the average total weekday boardings at this station was 714, and the average total weekday alightings was 713.

Station layout
Narberth has two low-level side platforms with pathways connecting the platforms to the inner tracks.

References

External links

SEPTA - Narberth Station
Page with historical pictures of station
 Station from Google StreetView

SEPTA Regional Rail stations
Former Pennsylvania Railroad stations
Philadelphia to Harrisburg Main Line
Railway stations in Montgomery County, Pennsylvania